Ampthill is a plantation located in Cartersville, Virginia, United States, roughly 45 minutes west of Richmond, and just over an hour south of Charlottesville.  The property is listed on both the National Register of Historic Places and the Virginia Landmarks Register.

History

Site history
In 1714 Charles Fleming took on a land patent of 670 acres (2.7 km2) with the intent to cultivate it.  The land, however, "lapsed" and was later granted to Thomas Randolph in 1722.  This area was later included in a tract made up of 2870 acres (11.6 km2), which was later known as "Clifton."  But it was this initial purchase of the 670 acres (2.7 km2) would form "The Fork," known for its position on the James and Willis Rivers.  It would later become Ampthill.  In 1724, Randolph sold to Robert "King" Carter, then the wealthiest landowner in Virginia.

In his will dated 22 August 1726, King Carter willed the 2870 acre (11.6 km2) tract to his then-unborn grandson, stipulating that the child carry the Carter name.  Some time later, Anne Carter and Major Benjamin Harrison of Berkley Plantation, christened a son, Carter Henry, who later became the owner of the property known as "Clifton" in Cumberland County, Virginia.

Carter Henry Harrison moved to Clifton upon graduation from law school. There, he raised his family and wrote the Cumberland Resolutions, which were presented to the community from the steps of the Effingham Tavern. These resolutions were later incorporated into the Virginia Resolutions and were the basis for the Declaration of Independence, written by Harrison's nephew, Thomas Jefferson.

Ampthill
Carter Henry Harrison died in 1793. In his will, Carter Henry willed Clifton to his son, Randolph, and The Fork to his son Robert. Robert sold The Fork to Shadrack Vaughan in 1804. Randolph later repurchased the property in 1815. The Fork was a clapboard structure of no more than three bedrooms. In 1815, the decision was made to add an addition to the existing manor.  Randolph called upon his cousin, Thomas Jefferson, to design the brick addition that exists today.  These plans exist today on file with the University of Virginia. The addition began its first phases of construction in 1835 and was completed in 1837.  The two "houses" were separate for a number of years until a one-story passageway was built to connect the two. After the construction of the brick addition was completed the structure was renamed Ampthill.

It was listed on the National Register of Historic Places in 1972.

Hard times and poor planning saw Ampthill pass from family member to family member over the years, finally falling out of the family's hands in 1923. Ampthill was then purchased by J. Rodgers and I. M. Baker, but as they were unable to meet the financial obligations of their mortgage, the land was then purchased by Frank Baber in 1933. This sale was never officially recorded, so Inez M. Baker, William Abernathy Baker and Irving Marshall Baker purchased the home from the Federal Land Bank in Baltimore and Frank and Mary Tyler Baber in 1936. The house was then sold to Dorothy Des Leal Neville and John Neville, who defaulted.  Ampthill and the existing land was then auctioned and purchased by Thomas G. Hardy and Andrew E. Godsey in 1952. In November of that year, the Rea family purchased the home from the Hardys and the Godseys. The Rea family lived at Ampthill for a number of years and sold the home in 1986 to the Saunders family, who were descended from the Harrison line that originally lived at Ampthill.

The Saunders later moved from the property and in 1998, the property was purchased by George Costen of Charlottesville. Beginning in 1999 and for a number of years that followed, Ampthill went under a major historic restoration, which included a near reconstruction of one of the outbuildings, which served as a garage for the Rea family for a number of years.

Ampthill was a bed and breakfast and enjoys the prestige of being the only privately owned Jeffersonian property in Virginia. Her windows are the original glass.

References

Houses completed in 1835
Houses in Cumberland County, Virginia
Plantations in Virginia
Houses on the National Register of Historic Places in Virginia
National Register of Historic Places in Cumberland County, Virginia